Elixir is the third studio album by Fourplay, released in 1995. Among the guest vocalists on this album are Phil Collins, Patti Austin, and Peabo Bryson.

Track listing

Personnel 
Fourplay
 Bob James – Yamaha C7 MIDI grand piano, keyboards, synthesizers, programming, synthesizer orchestrations, arrangements (4, 8)
 Lee Ritenour – electric guitars, classical guitar, guitar synthesizer, additional synthesizer and computer programming, arrangements (3)
 Nathan East – 5 and 6-string bass guitars, fretless bass, vocals (5, 9), vocal arrangements (8), arrangements (8), scat (9)
 Harvey Mason – drums, percussion, bongos, marimba, Jew's harp, arrangements (8)

Additional Musicians
 Harvey Mason, Jr. – synthesizer and computer programming, vocal arrangements (11)
 Ken Freeman – additional synthesizer and computer programming 
 Phil Collins – vocals (4)
 Patti Austin – vocals (8)
 Peabo Bryson – vocals (8)
 Vern Arnold – backing vocals (11)
 Cisco – backing vocals (11)
 Heather Mason – backing vocals (11)

Production 
 Fourplay – producers 
 Bob James – executive producer 
 Nathan East – vocal producer (8)
 Don Murray – recording, mixing
 Thom Kidd – additional recording 
 Harvey Mason, Jr. – additional recording 
 Lee Ritenour – additional recording 
 Mike Kloster – assistant engineer
 Kevin Lively – assistant engineer
 Robert Vosgien – digital editing 
 Wally Traugott – mastering 
 Linda Cobb – art direction, design
 James Minchin – photography

Studios
 Recorded at Sunset Sound (Hollywood, CA); Masong Studios (Los Angeles, CA); Starlight Studios (Malibu, CA); DARP Studios (Atlanta, GA); Remidi Studios (Ardsley-On-Hudson, NY).
 Edited at CMS Digital (Pasadena, CA).
 Mastered at Capitol Mastering (Hollywood, CA).

Reception

References 

1994 albums
Fourplay albums
Warner Records albums